Darna is a Philippine television drama action fantasy series broadcast by GMA Network. The series is based from Mars Ravelo's fictional Philippine superheroine of the same title. Directed by Dominic Zapata and Don Michael Perez, it stars Marian Rivera in the title role. It premiered on August 10, 2009 on the network's Telebabad line up replacing Zorro. The series concluded on February 19, 2010 with a total of 140 episodes. It was replaced by Panday Kids in its timeslot.

Cast and characters

Lead cast
 Marian Rivera as Narda / Darna / Evil Darna / Ex-O / Phoenix

Supporting cast
 Mark Anthony Fernandez as Eduardo / Black Rider
 Dennis Trillo as Pancho
 Iwa Moto as Valentina
 Nadine Samonte as Roma / Babaeng Impakta
 Ehra Madrigal as Armida / Babaeng Lawin
 Francine Prieto as Lucifera / Babaeng Tuod
 Maggie Wilson as Octavia Moran / Lutgarda Morales / Babaeng Linta
 Rochelle Pangilinan as Deborah Santos
 Jackie Rice as Helena / Helga
 Roxanne Barcelo as Aleli
 Buboy Villar as Carding "Ding" Santos
 Rufa Mae Quinto as Francesca
 Raymart Santiago as Crisanto
 Alfred Vargas as Gabriel
 Krista Kleiner as Liberty
 Polo Ravales as Shiro

Guest cast
 Akihiro Sato as Vladimir
 Maureen Larrazabal as Dina Arcilla
 Katrina Halili as Serpina / Valentina
 Paolo Contis as Kobra
 Regine Velasquez as Elektra
 Angel Aquino as the original Darna
 Caridad Sanchez as Loleng
 Celia Rodriguez as Perfecta
 Mike "Pekto" Nacua as Jerry
 John Feir as Tomas
 Eddie Garcia as Padre Mateo
 Ricky Davao as Dr. Morgan
 Gabby Eigenmann as Apollo
 Bearwin Meily as Watson
 Renz Valerio as young Eduardo
 Jestoni Alarcon as Simon
 Rita Avila as Alicia
 Angeli Nicole Sanoy as young Narda
 John Apacible as Nestor
 Janice de Belen as Aling Consuelo
 Sweet Ramos as young Valentina
 Allan "Mura" Padua as Impy
 Sabrina Man as young Serpina
 Hayden Kho as Danny
 Ella Guevara as Narda II

Reception

Ratings
According to AGB Nielsen Philippines' Mega Manila household television ratings, the pilot episode of Darna earned a 44.1% rating. While the final episode scored a 32.9% rating.

Critical response
Darna opened with positive reviews, writer Nestor Torre of Philippine Daily Inquirer said the pilot episode is "loud and livid". Torre continues to mention "...two performances stand out because they’re 'different'. The first is Janice de Belen’s portrayal of Consuelo, the mother of Valentina. De Belen’s characterization is outstanding, because it’s deeply felt, while not being over-the-top..." and "the other interesting performance thus far is turned in by Iwa Moto as Valentina. With some help from creative scripting, her character is more tragic and conflicted than past versions of the story had it".

Jun Lana's script was also praised by Torre for creating "Valentina's terrible secret initially pains her rather than turns her into a vengeful monster, and the ostracism she suffers adds enormously to her loneliness and grief, which are alleviated only by her only friend, Narda. Of course, the ironic twist to all this is that Narda will eventually morph into superheroine Darna, with whom Valentina must fight to the death." Lana told Manila Bulletin that this version of Darna will be "totally different" especially with the characters, he mentions "what if Narda doesn't want to become Darna?" - a subject never touched upon in other versions of the graphic novel.

References

External links
 

2009 Philippine television series debuts
2010 Philippine television series endings
Darna
Fantaserye and telefantasya
Filipino-language television shows
GMA Network drama series
Philippine action television series
Superhero television series
Television shows based on comics
Television shows set in the Philippines